Antarctospira angusteplicata is a species of sea snail, a marine gastropod mollusk in the family Borsoniidae.

Description
The length of the shell attains 21 mm.

Distribution
This marine species occurs off the Falkland Islands and the Strait Of Magellan, Tierra del Fuego, Argentina, South Atlantic Ocean

References

External links
 Strebel H. (1905). Beiträge zur Kenntnis der Molluskenfauna der Magelhaen-Provinz. No. 3. Zoologische Jahrbücher, Abteilung für Systematik, Geographie und Biologie der Tiere. 22: 575-666, pls 21-24
 Powell A. W. B. (1951). Antarctic and Subantarctic Mollusca: Pelecypoda and Gastropoda. Discovery Reports, 26: 47-196, pl. 5-10
 Kantor Y.I., Harasewych M.G. & Puillandre N. (2016). A critical review of Antarctic Conoidea (Neogastropoda). Molluscan Research. 36(3): 153-206
 
 Gastropods.com: Leucosyrinx paragenota
 Gastropods.com: Leucosyrinx angusteplicata

angusteplicata
Gastropods described in 1905